Anolis utilensis, the Utila anole or mangrove anole, is a species of lizard in the family Dactyloidae. The species is found in Honduras.

References

Anoles
Reptiles described in 1996
Endemic fauna of Honduras
Reptiles of Honduras
Taxa named by Gunther Köhler